Howard Malcolm Snapp (September 27, 1855 – August 14, 1938) was a U.S. Representative from Illinois, son of Henry Snapp who had also been a U.S. representative from Illinois.

Born in Joliet, Illinois, Snapp attended the Eastern Avenue school and Forest University in Chicago, Illinois from 1872 to 1875. Snapp studied law. He was admitted to the bar in 1878 and commenced practice in Globe, Arizona and returned to Joliet, Illinois, and continued the practice of law. He served as master in chancery for Will County, Illinois, from 1884 to 1903.

Snapp was elected chairman of the Will County Republican central committee in 1893.
He served as delegate to the Republican National Conventions in 1896 and 1908 and was elected as a Republican to the Fifty-eighth and to the three succeeding Congresses (March 4, 1903 – March 3, 1911). He was not a candidate for renomination in 1910, but resumed the practice of law in Joliet, Illinois. He died in Joliet, Illinois, August 14, 1938. His interment  was located in Joliet's Elmhurst Cemetery.

References

1855 births
1938 deaths
People from Joliet, Illinois
Republican Party members of the United States House of Representatives from Illinois